Marion–Florence USD 408 is a public unified school district headquartered in Marion, Kansas, United States. The district includes the communities of Marion, Florence, Aulne, Canada, Eastshore, Marion County Lake, and nearby rural areas of Marion County.

History
In 1945, the School Reorganization Act in Kansas caused the consolidation of thousands of rural school districts in Kansas.  In 1963, the School Unification Act in Kansas caused the further consolidatation of thousands of tiny school districts into hundreds of larger Unified School Districts. 

High school students from Florence started attending Marion High School in fall 1971 after the Florence High School was closed in the same year.

Current schools
The school district operates the following schools:
 Marion High School at 701 East Main Street in Marion
 Marion Middle School at 125 South Lincoln Street in Marion
 Marion Elementary School at 1400 East Lawrence Street in Marion

Closed schools
 Florence High School in Florence. It was closed.
 Florence Elementary School in Florence. It was closed.

See also
 Kansas State Department of Education
 Kansas State High School Activities Association
 List of high schools in Kansas
 List of unified school districts in Kansas

References

Further reading

External links
 

School districts in Kansas
Education in Marion County, Kansas